Kentwood may refer to:

United Kingdom
Kentwood (Reading ward), part of Tilehurst

United States
Kentwood, Louisiana
Kentwood, Michigan
Kentwood High School (Washington), in Covington

See also
Kenwood (disambiguation)